USS Gallery (FFG-26), eighteenth ship of the  of guided-missile frigates, was named for three brothers: Rear Admiral Daniel V. Gallery (1901–1977), Rear Admiral William O. Gallery (1904–1981), and Rear Admiral Philip D. Gallery (1907–1973).  Ordered from Bath Iron Works, Bath, Maine, on 28 February 1977 as part of the FY77 program, Gallery was laid down on 17 May 1980, launched on 20 December 1980, co-sponsored by Mrs. Philip D. Gallery and Mrs. Daniel V. Gallery, and commissioned on 5 December 1981, commanded by Commander Norman Stuart Scott.  Decommissioned and stricken on 14 June 1996, she was transferred to Egypt on 25 September 1996 as Taba (F916). , she remained in active service with the Egyptian Navy.

Gallery was the first ship of that name in the US Navy.

Coat of arms

Shield
The colors green and gold, and the rampant lions have been adapted from a personal device of the Gallery family.  The lions, symbolic of courage and strength, face in different directions indicating that the brothers for whom this ship is named, served in both theaters of operation during World War II. The star alludes to their many awards, and denote excellence and achievement.  The crossed swords, adapted from the Officer and Enlisted badges, allude to Naval Combat Operations.

Crest
Blue and gold are the colors traditionally associated with the Navy.  The upraised arm in green and gold is an adaptation from the Gallery family device.  The collared and chained sea-wolf symbolizes the only capture of a U-boat from the German wolf-packs during World War II.  The crest also symbolizes the curbing and destruction of the enemy sub activities in the Pacific theatre.

Motto
Manu Forti – "With a Strong Hand"

References

External links

Oliver Hazard Perry-class frigates of the United States Navy
Ships built in Bath, Maine
1980 ships
Cold War frigates and destroyer escorts of the United States
Mubarak-class frigates
Frigates of Egypt